Feliz is a municipality in the Brazilian state of Rio Grande do Sul.

Other uses of Feliz or Féliz include:

People

Given name
 Feliz Vaz (born 1989), Portuguese professional footballer

Middle name
 Leopoldo Felíz Severa (fl. 1917–1920), Puerto Rican politician

Surname

Athletes
 Andrés Feliz (born 1997), Dominican basketball player
 Juan Feliz (born 1937), Spanish sprint canoer
 Lidio Andrés Feliz (born 1997), Dominican sprinter
 Michael Feliz (born 1993), Dominican baseball pitcher
 Noemí Feliz (born 1988), Spanish swimmer
 Neftalí Feliz (born 1988), Dominican baseball pitcher
 Pedro Feliz (born 1975), Dominican baseball infielder

Other
 Antonio A. Feliz, American religious figure
 Arturo Féliz-Camilo (born 1977), Dominican author and chef
 Jandy Feliz (born 1977), Dominican singer-songwriter
 Jordan Feliz (born 1989), American Christian musician
 José Vicente Feliz (c. 1741 – 1822), Spanish-Mexican soldier and settler
 Lesandro Guzman-Feliz (2002–2018), American high-school student and murder victim
 Oswald Feliz, American politician in New York City
 Rhenzy Feliz (born 1997), American actor
 Rolando Florián Féliz (died 2009), Dominican drug trafficker and convicted murderer

Places

Communities

Brazil
 Alto Feliz, in Rio Grande do Sul
 Espera Feliz, in Minas Gerais
 Feliz Deserto, in Alagoas
 Feliz Natal, in Mato Grosso
 Porto Feliz, in São Paulo

United States
 Los Feliz, Los Angeles, California
 Ojo Feliz, New Mexico

Other
 Ayala Malls Feliz, a shopping mall in Metro Manila, Philippines
 Can Feliz, summer residence of Danish architect Jørn Utzon near Portopetro, Mallorca
 Los Feliz Boulevard, a street in Glendale and Los Angeles, California, United States
 Rancho Feliz, historical Mexican land grant in present-day San Mateo County, California, United States
 Rancho Los Feliz, historical Spanish land concession in present-day Los Angeles County, California, United States

Songs
 Feliz (song), 2009 Latin pop song performed by Kany García
 Feliz Navidad (song), 1970 Christmas song by José Feliciano
 Tan Feliz, 2009 song by American artist Pee Wee

Other uses
 Aero Feliz, a defunct Mexican passenger airline
 Feliz! (TV program), an annual television special on New Year's Eve
 Feliz Navidad (disambiguation), Spanish phrase meaning "Happy Christmas"

See also
 Felix (disambiguation)
 Filiz